Goose Creek Village is a census-designated place (CDP) in Loudoun County, Virginia, United States. It was first drawn as a CDP prior to the 2020 census.

Geography
Goose Creek Village is east of the center of Loudoun County, on the west side of Belmont Ridge Road. The Dulles Greenway (Virginia Route 267) runs through the southern part of the CDP, leading northwest  to Leesburg, the county seat, and southeast  to Washington Dulles International Airport. The community is bordered to the east by Ashburn.

The community sits on the west side of a ridge above Goose Creek, a north-flowing tributary of the Potomac River.

References

Census-designated places in Loudoun County, Virginia
Washington metropolitan area
Census-designated places in Virginia